Dinsmore Airport may refer to:

 Dinsmore Airport (California) in Dinsmore, California, United States (FAA: D63)
 Dinsmore Aerodrome in Dinsmore, Saskatchewan, Canada (TC: CKX5)